The Serbia women's national rugby sevens team represents Serbia in international rugby sevens competitions and is controlled by Serbian rugby federation. Serbia currently competes in European B division.

External links
Serbian rugby federation
FIRA-AER website, B division teams

Rugby union in Serbia
r
Women's national rugby sevens teams